The Pacific Coast League (PCL) is a Minor League Baseball league that operates in the United States at the Triple-A level, which is one grade below Major League Baseball. A champion has been determined at the end of each season since the league was formed in 1903. 

Through 1927, champions were usually the regular-season pennant winners—the team with the best win–loss record at the conclusion of the regular season. From 1928 to 1954, postseason playoffs were the predominant method of determining champions. Participants from 1936 to 1954 were the four teams with the highest winning percentages. After a period of postseason dormancy, the playoffs returned in 1963 along with the advent of a divisional alignment. From 1963 to 1977, the winners of each of two divisions vied for the championship. The league operated using a split season format from 1978 to 1997, with the winners of each half facing off for the right to play for the PCL crown. From 1998 to 2020, the league was split into two conferences of two divisions each. The division winners within each conference met to determine conference champions, and those winners competed for the league championship. The 2021 winner was the team with the best regular-season record. As of 2022, the league championship is determined by a single-game playoff at a neutral location between the East and West division winners, with the winner meeting the champion of the International League in the Triple-A National Championship Game.

The San Francisco Seals won 14 Pacific Coast League championships, more than any other team, followed by the Los Angeles Angels (12) and the Albuquerque Dukes and Portland Beavers (8). Among active PCL franchises, the Tacoma Rainiers have seven championships, the most of all teams, followed by the Sacramento River Cats (5) and the Las Vegas Aviators and Oklahoma City Dodgers (2).

History

Pre-playoff era (1903–1927)

The Pacific Coast League was founded in 1903. A league champion has been determined at the end of each season. With few exceptions, champions from 1903 to 1927 were simply the regular-season pennant winners—the team with the best win–loss record at the conclusion of the regular championship season. The first league champions were the Los Angeles Angels, who won by  games over the Sacramento Senators in 1903.

The 1904 and 1905 seasons were contested as split seasons. Under this format, the schedule was split into two parts. The team with the best record at the end of the first season won the first pennant. Standings were then reset so that all clubs had clean records to begin the second season. If the first season winner also won the second season, they were declared the league champion. If a different team won the second season, the two winners would meet in a playoff series to determine the champion. The Tacoma Tigers, winners of the first half of the 1904 season, won the first PCL playoff championship by defeating Los Angeles, who tied with Tacoma for the best record in the second half, 5–4–1, in a best-of-ten-games series. Roles were reversed in 1904 as Los Angeles bested Tacoma, 5–1.

The only other playoffs during this period occurred in 1918. After two PCL cities, San Francisco and Salt Lake City, passed "work or fight" laws to aid the effort to win World War I, league directors voted to suspend the season after the games of July 14. A postseason series between the first-place Vernon Tigers and second-place Los Angeles was held to decide the champion. Los Angeles won, 4–2.

Rise and fall of the Governors' Cup (1928–1962)

Playoffs were held briefly from 1928 to 1931, again involving a split season with the winners of each half meeting in a best-of-seven series to determine champions. In 1928, the San Francisco Seals defeated the Sacramento Senators, 4–2, to win the first Governors' Cup. The Seals and future winners of the playoffs were awarded a trophy cup named in recognition of the three states with PCL teams at the time: California, Oregon, and Washington. The league returned to recognizing pennant winners as champions from 1932 to 1935.

The Governors' Cup playoffs were revived and expanded from 1936 to 1954. Utilizing the Shaughnessy playoff system, the top four teams in the league, based on winning percentage, competed for the championship. The first round typically consisted of a best-of-seven series between the first and fourth-place teams and a series between the second and third-place teams. The winners of these semifinals then faced one another for the championship in a best-of-seven series. The first four-team Governors' Cup was won in 1933 by the Portland Beavers, who defeated the Oakland Oaks, 4–1. Financial problems resulted in the cancellation of the playoffs in 1950, 1952, and 1953 and the shortening of the final round to best-of-three series in 1951 and 1954. The last Governors' Cup, awarded in 1954, was won by Oakland, who swept San Francisco for the title.

Postseason play and the awarding of the Governors' Cup was discontinued from 1955 to 1962. During this time, regular-season pennant winner were declared champions. The trophy itself was placed in the Helms Athletic Foundation Museum in Los Angeles in 1954, sold to a collector when the museum closed, and was subsequently stolen. A number of other trophies have been awarded to championship teams in later years during which postseason play occurred. The one given in the 1980s and early 1990s was four feet tall and incorporated three full-size baseball bats and a glove. One design from the mid-1990s resembled Major League Baseball's Commissioner's Trophy issued to World Series champions. From 1998 to 2019, the trophy was an engraved glass wedge fixed to a wooden base.

Divisional era (1963–present)

The Pacific Coast League divided its teams into two divisions for the first time in 1963 after absorbing three teams from the former American Association, which had disbanded after the previous season. From 1963 to 1977, the winners of each division met in a best-of-seven series (sometimes five) to determine a champion. The playoffs were expanded to include two wild card teams in 1978. The winners of each division faced the second-place team in their own division, and the winners of these semifinals then played for the PCL championship, with each series being the best-of-five games.

From 1979 to 1997, the PCL adopted a split season format while maintaining its divisional alignment. Typically, the first and second-half champions within each division played a semifinal series to decide division champions. The winners of these then played for the league championship. In some instances, a team that won both halves of the season received a bye into the championship round, while in others the team in that division with the second-place full-season record was awarded a wild-card berth and became the first-place team's opponent. The divisional round began as a best-of-three contest, but it was expanded to the best-of-five in 1983. The championship round was usually contested as a best-of-five series, but it became the best-of-seven in some seasons. 

The PCL expanded again in 1998 when the American Association, which had been revived in 1969, dissolved for a final time after the 1997 season. The league was then split into two eight-team conferences consisting of two four-team divisions. The division winners within each conference met in a best-of-five series to determine conference champions. Then, the conference winners played a best-of-five series to decide the league champion.

The 2020 season was cancelled due to the COVID-19 pandemic. The Pacific Coast League ceased operations before the 2021 season in conjunction with Major League Baseball's (MLB) reorganization of Minor League Baseball. In place of the league, MLB created the Triple-A West, a circuit divided into two divisions of four teams each. Prior to the 2022 season, MLB renamed the Triple-A West the Pacific Coast League, and it carried on the history of the PCL prior to reorganization. Rather than hold playoffs for its championship, the Triple-A West's 2021 title was awarded to the team with the best regular-season record. The Tacoma Rainiers won this championship by two games ahead of the Sugar Land Skeeters. In 2022, the winners of each division, East and West, will meet in a single game to determine the league champion.

Champions

Wins by team

Active Pacific Coast League teams appear in bold.

See also

List of American Association champions
List of International League champions

Notes

References
Specific

General

Champions
Pacific Coast
Pacific Coast League champions
Pacific Coast League